The United States District Court for the Southern District of New York (in case citations, S.D.N.Y.) is a federal trial court whose geographic jurisdiction encompasses eight counties of New York State. Two of these are in New York City: New York (Manhattan) and Bronx; six are in the Hudson Valley: Westchester, Putnam, Rockland, Orange, Dutchess, and Sullivan. Appeals from the Southern District of New York are taken to the United States Court of Appeals for the Second Circuit (except for patent claims and claims against the U.S. government under the Tucker Act, which are appealed to the Federal Circuit).

Because it covers Manhattan, the Southern District of New York has long been one of the most active and influential federal trial courts in the United States. It often has jurisdiction over America's largest financial institutions and prosecution of white-collar crime and other federal crimes. Because of its age and influence, it is sometimes colloquially called the "Mother Court" or the "Sovereign District of New York." The district has had several prominent judges on its bench, including Learned Hand, Michael Mukasey, and Sonia Sotomayor, and many of the U.S. Attorneys for the district have been prominent American legal and political figures, such as Elihu Root, Henry L. Stimson, Robert Morgenthau, Rudy Giuliani, James Comey, Michael J. Garcia, and Preet Bharara.

Jurisdiction 

The United States District Court for the Southern District of New York encompasses the counties of New York, Bronx, Westchester, Rockland, Putnam, Orange, Dutchess, and Sullivan and draws jurors from those counties. The Court also shares jurisdiction over the waters of the counties of Kings, Nassau, Queens, Richmond, and Suffolk with the United States District Court for the Eastern District of New York. The Court hears cases in Manhattan, White Plains, and Poughkeepsie, New York.

The United States Attorney's Office for the Southern District of New York represents the United States in civil and criminal litigation in the Court.  the United States Attorney is Damian Williams. The court sits in the Thurgood Marshall United States Courthouse and Daniel Patrick Moynihan United States Courthouse, both in Manhattan, and in the Charles L. Brieant Jr. Federal Building and Courthouse in White Plains.

History 

The United States District Court for the District of New York was one of the original 13 courts established by the Judiciary Act of 1789, 1 Stat. 73, on September 24, 1789. It first sat at the old Merchants Exchange on Broad Street in November 1789, the first federal court to do so.  The Act of April 9, 1814, 3 Stat. 120, divided the District of New York into Northern and Southern Districts.
The subdivision of the district was reportedly instigated by Matthias B. Tallmadge, out of antipathy for fellow district judge William P. Van Ness. These Districts were later further subdivided with the creation of the Eastern District on February 25, 1865 by 13 Stat. 438, and the Western District on May 12, 1900, by 31 Stat. 175.
Public Law 95-408 (enacted October 2, 1978) transferred Columbia, Greene, and Ulster counties from the Southern to the Northern district.

For the first hundred years of its existence, the case load of the district was dominated first by admiralty cases, and then by a mix of admiralty and bankruptcy cases. The primary responsibility for hearing bankruptcy cases has since been transferred to the United States Bankruptcy Court for the Southern District of New York, with the District Court only reviewing cases already decided by a bankruptcy judge.

Since its creation, the Southern District of New York has had over 150 judges, more than any other District. Twenty-one judges from the Southern District of New York have been elevated to the United States Court of Appeals for the Second Circuit—Samuel Blatchford, Charles Merrill Hough, Learned Hand, Julius Marshuetz Mayer, Augustus Noble Hand, Martin Thomas Manton, Robert P. Patterson, Harold Medina, Irving Kaufman, Wilfred Feinberg, Walter R. Mansfield, Murray Gurfein, Lawrence W. Pierce, Pierre N. Leval, John M. Walker Jr., Sonia Sotomayor, Denny Chin, Barrington Daniels Parker Jr., Gerard E. Lynch, Richard J. Sullivan, and Alison Nathan. Blatchford and Sotomayor, after being elevated from the Southern District of New York to serve as Circuit Judges for the Second Circuit, were later elevated to the Supreme Court of the United States. The longest serving judge, David Norton Edelstein, served as an active judge for 43 years to the day, and in senior status for an additional six years.

Judges of the court have gone on to other high governmental positions. Robert P. Patterson served as Under Secretary of War under President Franklin Roosevelt and was Secretary of War under President Harry S. Truman. Louis Freeh served as Director of the Federal Bureau of Investigation from September 1993 to June 2001. Michael Mukasey served as the 81st United States Attorney General under President George W. Bush.

Notable cases 

 The injury and loss of life claims from the sinking of the Titanic, the torpedo attack on the Lusitania and the fire aboard the General Slocum were heard in the S.D.N.Y. 
 The espionage trial of Julius and Ethel Rosenberg and the perjury trial of Alger Hiss were heard in the S.D.N.Y.
 Judge John M. Woolsey of the S.D.N.Y. rejected government efforts to censor on obscenity grounds the distribution of James Joyce's Ulysses. 
 Judge Murray Gurfein of the Court rejected government efforts to enjoin The New York Times from publishing the Pentagon Papers.
 Defamation suits were heard in the S.D.N.Y. against CBS and Time magazine by General William Westmoreland and Israeli General Ariel Sharon.
 Two former Attorneys General of the United States were indicted and tried in the S.D.N.Y. for crimes while in office – Harry Daugherty of the Teapot Dome era and John Mitchell of the Watergate era. Juries were unable to reach verdicts in the two trials against Daugherty; John Mitchell was acquitted.
 Financial frauds have been prosecuted in the S.D.N.Y., among them the cases against Bernard Madoff, Ivan Boesky, Michael Milken, and Sam Bankman-Fried.
 Bombings: the trials of those accused of the 1998 United States embassy bombings in East Africa; those alleged to have been responsible for the 1993 World Trade Center bombing; and Omar Abdel Rahman (known in the press as "The Blind Sheikh"), occurred in the District. More recently, the prosecution arising out of the 2010 Times Square car bombing attempt were each heard in the S.D.N.Y.
 Bridgeman v. Corel (1999) established that exact reproductions of public domain paintings were not subject to copyright protection.
 Viacom Inc. v. YouTube Inc., a $1 billion lawsuit against Google and YouTube on the grounds of alleged copyright infringement. The DMCA safe harbor law became the main argument in the case.
 Prosecution of Abduwali Muse, the so-called "Somali Pirate", was heard in the Court.
 The criminal cases against Bess Myerson, Leona Helmsley and Martha Stewart were heard in the S.D.N.Y., as was the U.S. case against Imelda Marcos.
 The Deflategate controversy concerning the National Football League's Tom Brady was heard in the S.D.N.Y.
 Hosseinzadeh v. Klein, concerning the practice of fair use in online video content, was heard in the S.D.N.Y.
 On December 12, 2018, Judge William H. Pauley III sentenced Michael Cohen – who had served as personal legal counsel to U.S. president Donald Trump for more than a decade – to "three years in prison and millions in forfeitures, restitution and fines", after pleading guilty to charges including campaign finance violations, tax evasion and committing perjury while under oath before Congress.
In July 2022, Real Housewives of Salt Lake City star Jennifer Shah pleaded guilty to conspiracy to commit wire fraud in the S.D.N.Y. In January 2023, Shah was sentenced to six-and-a-half years in prison.

Current judges 
:

Vacancies and pending nominations

Former judges

Chief judges

Succession of seats

See also 
 Courts of New York
 For the People, a 2018 fictional television drama about the lawyers and judges of the Southern District
 List of current United States district judges
 List of judges of the United States Bankruptcy Court for the Southern District of New York
 List of lawsuits involving Donald Trump
 List of United States federal courthouses in New York

References

External links 
 Official website for the U.S. District Court for the Southern District of New York
 Official website for the U.S. Bankruptcy Court for the Southern District of New York
 Official website for the U.S. Attorney's Office for the Southern District of New York
 Official website of the Southern District Court Reporters

 
New York (state) law
Manhattan
White Plains, New York
1814 establishments in New York (state)
New York, South
Courthouses in New York (state)
Courthouses in New York City
Courts and tribunals established in 1814